Council elections were held on 4 December 2021 to elect the Newcastle City Council. The elections coincided with the 2021 New South Wales local elections.

Labor's Nuatali Nelmes was re-elected Lord Mayor. Labor claimed victory at 7:00pm that night.

Electoral system
The City of Newcastle has 13 councillors. 12 members are elected from four wards, each ward electing three councillors. The remaining seat is held by the Lord Mayor.

Results

Mayoral election

Council election

References

Newcastle
Newcastle City Council elections (Australia)